"Goody Goody" is a 1936 popular song composed by Matty Malneck, with lyrics by Johnny Mercer.
First recording of the song was by Ted Wallace and His Swing Kings (vocal refrain by male trio) [Bluebird, B-6252-B, 1936]. The song is referenced several times in the 1936 Kaufman and Hart play "You Can't Take It With You". Popular recordings in 1936 were by Benny Goodman and his Orchestra (with vocalist Helen Ward), Freddy Martin & His Orchestra (vocal by Terry Shand), and by Bob Crosby & His Orchestra.

Frankie Lymon performed it live on television on several occasions, including twice in 1957 on The Ed Sullivan Show. He also had a hit with his recording of the song in the United States, reaching #20 that year, as well as #24 in the UK. It was released as a recording with his group the Teenagers, but was, in fact, a solo recording.

Shelley Winters's character in Curtis Harrington's 1971 thriller What's the Matter with Helen? plays the song at the end of the movie.

The song was performed by 'Wayne & Wanda' in an episode of The Muppet Show.

A recording by the BBC Dance Orchestra was featured in the film The Water Horse: Legend of the Deep (2007).

Bobby Rydell performed the song at his live shows (Las Vegas, 2015).

Other notable recordings
 Teddy Stauffer & the Original Teddies (1936)
 Mel Torme (1954)
 Peggy Lee, early 1950s
 Frankie Lymon – Single - 1957-07: Gee 1039  (1957)
 Ella Fitzgerald – Ella at the Opera House (1957), Get Happy! (1959)
 Julie London – Julie Is Her Name, Volume II (1958)
 Della Reese – Della (1960)
 Frank Sinatra – Sinatra and Swingin' Brass (1962)
 Robert "Goodie" Whitfield - Call Me Goodie (1982)
 Rosemary Clooney – Sings The Lyrics Of Johnny Mercer (1987)
 Chicago – Night & Day Big Band (1995)
 Camille O'Sullivan – performed the song, with Will Young, in the 2005 Academy Award- and Golden Globe-nominated film Mrs. Henderson Presents starring Dame Judi Dench, Bob Hoskins and Will Young.  The movie's soundtrack was nominated for the BAFTA Award for Best Film Music.
 Marina Xavier – Where Do You Start? (2010)
 Tony Bennett and Lady Gaga – Cheek to Cheek (2014)
 Freak Kitchen – Cooking with Pagans (2014)
 Beau Monga – X-Factor NZ (2015)

References

1936 songs
Benny Goodman songs
Songs with music by Matty Malneck
Songs with lyrics by Johnny Mercer